Pablo Andújar was the defending champion but chose not to defend his title.

Pedro Martínez won the title after defeating Jaume Munar 7–6(7–4), 6–2 in the final.

Seeds

Draw

Finals

Top half

Bottom half

References

External links
Main draw
Qualifying draw

Marbella Tennis Open - Singles